Atylostoma is a genus of flies in the family Tachinidae.

Species
 Atylostoma javanum (Brauer & Bergenstamm, 1895)
 Atylostoma towadensis (Matsumura, 1916)

References

Tachinidae